Jayaprakash Manikandan (born 22 November 1998) is an Indian cricketer. He made his Twenty20 debut on 17 January 2021, for Puducherry in the 2020–21 Syed Mushtaq Ali Trophy.

References

External links
 

1998 births
Living people
Indian cricketers
Pondicherry cricketers
Place of birth missing (living people)